"Cinderella" is a song written by Reed Nielsen, and recorded by American country music artist Vince Gill.  It was released in March 1987 as the first single from the album The Way Back Home.  The song reached #5 on the Billboard Hot Country Singles & Tracks chart.

Chart performance

References

Songs based on fairy tales
1987 singles
1987 songs
Vince Gill songs
RCA Records Nashville singles
Song recordings produced by Richard Landis
Songs written by Reed Nielsen